Maurice Stokes (June 17, 1933 – April 6, 1970) was an American professional basketball player. He played for the Cincinnati/Rochester Royals of the National Basketball Association (NBA) from 1955 to 1958. Stokes was a three-time NBA All-Star, a three-time All-NBA Second Team member and the 1956 NBA Rookie of the Year. His career – and later his life – was cut short by a debilitating brain injury and paralysis. 

Stokes is a namesake of the NBA's Twyman–Stokes Teammate of the Year Award alongside Jack Twyman, who served as Stokes' legal guardian during the final years of his life. Stokes was inducted into the Naismith Basketball Hall of Fame in 2004.

Early life
Stokes was born in Rankin, Pennsylvania near Pittsburgh, one of four children — he had a twin sister and two brothers. His father worked in a steel mill and his mother was a domestic. When Maurice was age 8, the family moved to nearby Homewood, where he later attended Westinghouse High School.  Stokes did not start his first two years at Westinghouse, but in his last two years, he helped lead the Bulldogs to back-to-back city championships in 1950 and 1951.

College career
Stokes attended and graduated from Saint Francis College in Loretto, Pennsylvania. There he led the Red Flash to the 1955 National Invitation Tournament and was named Most Valuable Player although his team finished fourth in the tournament. In his first college season, Stokes averaged 23.1 points and 26.5 rebounds per game.  In the following season, he averaged 27.1 points and 26.2 rebounds per game. Stokes remains St. Francis' all-time leading rebounder with 1,819 and is second in scoring with 2,282 points. The Red Flash were 79-30 during Stokes' four seasons. He was later inducted in the St. Francis University Athletic Hall of Fame.

Professional career

Rochester / Cincinnati Royals (1955–1958) 
Playing for the National Basketball Association's Rochester Royals, which became the Cincinnati Royals in 1957, from 1955 to 1958, Stokes averaged 16.3 rebounds per game during his rookie season and was named NBA Rookie of the Year. The next season, he set a league record for most rebounds in a single season with 1,256 (17.4 per game). Stokes was second in the NBA in rebounds and third in assists in 1957–58; a feat only Wilt Chamberlain has matched for a full season.

During his three seasons in the NBA (1955–58), he grabbed more rebounds than any other player with 3,492 (Bob Pettit was second with 3,417) and also amassed 1,062 assists, which was second in the NBA only to Boston Celtics' point guard Bob Cousy (1,583). Stokes was named an All-Star and All-NBA Second Team for all three seasons of his career. He was inducted into the Naismith Memorial Basketball Hall of Fame in September 2004.

He is one of eight NBA players who have recorded four consecutive triple-doubles.

Injury and paralysis
On March 12, 1958, in the last game of the 1957–58 NBA regular season, Stokes was knocked unconscious after he drove to the basket, drew contact, and struck his head as he fell to the court. He was revived with smelling salts and returned to the game. Three days later, after recording 12 points and 15 rebounds in an opening-round playoff game against the Detroit Pistons, he became ill on the team's flight back to Cincinnati. Stokes later suffered a seizure and was left permanently paralyzed. He was diagnosed with post-traumatic encephalopathy, a brain injury that damaged his motor-control center.

During the years that followed, Stokes would be supported and cared for by his lifelong friend and teammate, Jack Twyman, who became Stokes' legal guardian. Although permanently paralyzed, Stokes was mentally alert and communicated by blinking his eyes. He adopted a grueling physical therapy regimen that eventually allowed him limited physical movement, and he eventually regained limited speaking ability. Stokes' condition deteriorated through the 1960s and he was later transferred to Good Samaritan Hospital in Cincinnati, where Twyman continued to be a regular visitor.

Death
Twelve years after his injury, Stokes died at age 36 from a heart attack on April 6, 1970. He thereafter received a series of Catholic funerals.

At his own request, he was buried in Franciscan Friar Cemetery on the campus of Saint Francis.

Legacy
After Jack Twyman became his legal guardian, he organized a charity exhibition basketball game in 1958 to help raise funds for Stokes' medical expenses.  That game, spearheaded by Milton Kutsher, became an annual tradition and was named the Maurice Stokes Memorial Basketball Game. It was later changed to the Maurice Stokes/Wilt Chamberlain Celebrity Pro-Am Golf Tournament due to NBA and insurance company restrictions regarding athletes.

Stokes' life, injury, and relationship with Twyman are all depicted in the 1973 National General Pictures film Maurie.

NBA Twyman-Stokes Teammate of the Year Award
On June 9, 2013, the NBA announced that both Stokes and Jack Twyman would be honored with an annual award in their names, the Twyman–Stokes Teammate of the Year Award, which recognizes the player that embodies the league's ideal teammate that season.

The Maurice Stokes Athletics Center

The Maurice Stokes Athletics Center (originally called the Maurice Stokes Physical Education Building when it opened in 1971) on the St. Francis University campus is named after him.

NBA career statistics

Regular season

Playoffs

See also
List of National Basketball Association annual rebounding leaders
List of National Basketball Association single-game rebounding leaders
List of NCAA Division I men's basketball players with 30 or more rebounds in a game
List of NCAA Division I men's basketball players with 2,000 points and 1,000 rebounds

References

Farabaugh, Pat.  An Unbreakable Bond: The Brotherhood of Maurice Stokes and Jack Twyman, Haworth, N.J.: St. Johann Press, 2014.

External links 
College statistics
ESPN's Biography of Maurice Stokes: Stokes' life a tale of tragedy and friendship

1933 births
1970 deaths
African-American Catholics
All-American college men's basketball players
American men's basketball players
Basketball players from Pennsylvania
Cincinnati Royals players
Naismith Memorial Basketball Hall of Fame inductees
National Basketball Association All-Stars
National Basketball Association players with retired numbers
National Collegiate Basketball Hall of Fame inductees
People from Rankin, Pennsylvania
Power forwards (basketball)
Rochester Royals draft picks
Rochester Royals players
Saint Francis Red Flash men's basketball players
Sportspeople from the Pittsburgh metropolitan area